The Lee Konitz Duets is an album by American saxophonist Lee Konitz, recorded in 1967 and released in 1968 on the Milestone label.

Track listing
"Struttin' With Some Barbecue" - 3:07
"You Don't Know What Love Is" - 3:33
"Variations on Alone Together" - 15:03
"Checkerboard" - 5:50
"Erb" - 3:09
"Tickletoe" - 2:59
"Duplexity" - 6:19
"Alphanumeric"	- 5:17

Personnel
Lee Konitz - alto sax (1-5, 8), tenor sax (3, 6-7), baritone sax (1), amplified alto sax (3, 8)
Joe Henderson - tenor sax (2, 8)
Richie Kamuca - tenor sax (6, 8)
Marshall Brown - valve trombone (1, 8), euphonium (1)
Dick Katz - piano (4, 8)
Karl Berger - vibes (3, 8)
Jim Hall - guitar (5, 8)
Eddie Gómez - bass (3, 8)
Elvin Jones - drums (3, 8)
Ray Nance - violin (7)

References

Milestone Records albums
Lee Konitz albums
1968 albums